Sione Timani (born 3 September 1984) is a Tongan rugby union footballer player at Lock for Tarbes, before joining Colomiers at the start of the 2016/17 season.

Timani played for Carmarthen Quins between 2009 and 2011, before signing for the Scarlets. After 3 seasons there, he moved to play for Tarbes in the Pro D2. On 23 February 2016, it was confirmed that Timani would join Colomiers.
He has 7 caps for Tonga.
Sione has two brothers playing professional rugby in Australia, Sitaleki and Lopeti.

References

External links
 http://www.scarlets.co.uk/eng/news/3994.php

1984 births
Living people
Scarlets players
US Colomiers players
Tongan rugby union players
Tonga international rugby union players
Tongan expatriate rugby union players
Expatriate rugby union players in Wales
Tongan expatriate sportspeople in Wales
People from Tongatapu
Rugby union locks